The Socolău is a right tributary of the river Ruscova in Romania. Its largest tributary is the Roșușul Mic. It discharges into the Ruscova near Poienile de sub Munte.

References

Rivers of Romania
Rivers of Maramureș County